The AHICE project (Art Historian Information from Central Europe) is a supraregional art and heritage news service, bringing together almost 170 partners from the Visegrád Group countries. Its aim is to facilitate access to information about events in the Czech Republic, Hungary, Poland and Slovakia. The ICC's institutional partners in the AHICE project are the Moravian Gallery (Czech Republic), the Department of Art History at Comenius University (Slovakia) and the National Office of Cultural Heritage (Hungary). The service is a project of the International Culture Center in Cracow.

External links
 Official page of AHICE
 International Culture Center in Cracow
 Moravian Gallery
 National Office of Cultural Heritage in Budapest
 Department of Art History at Comenius University

Arts organisations based in Poland